Stadium Jakarta is a basketball club based in Jakarta, Indonesia that plays in the National Basketball League (Indonesia).

Achievements: NBL Indonesia Semifinals - 2013, 2015

Basketball teams in Indonesia
Sport in Jakarta
Basketball teams established in 1994